The prisons in Germany are run solely by the federal states but governed by a federal law. The aim of prison confinement in Germany is twofold: emphasis is placed on enabling prisoners to lead a life of "social responsibility free of crime" upon release, but society is also to be protected from further acts of crime by the guilty. Prisons in Germany differ from those of many other countries since the focus is not entirely on punishment. Germany has a goal of rehabilitation for prisoners so that they can have successful re-entry into the community. That is why many German prisons have the feel of a community in which prisoners are given different freedoms and responsibilities. Often, prisoners have television, posters hanging in their cells, or "free time" in which they can roam around outside their cells.

Organization
The head offices for the state prison services are in the respective state justice ministry.  There, a prison service department controls the organization of the prison service, personnel matters, basic and advanced training for prison staff, budgets, construction, cooperation in prison service legislation, the employment of prisoners, and vocational training and education for prisoners.  It also reviews petitions and complaints and its representatives visit and inspect the prisons regularly.  There is no mid-level authority anymore between the Ministry of Justice and the prisons.  This direct contact facilitates decision-making and ensures the ministry is close to the life of the prison service.

Confinement
As a rule, pretrial confinement is conducted at a facility close to the public prosecutor's office that is prosecuting the case.  Criminals who have never been imprisoned (or were imprisoned for a maximum of three months) are generally assigned to prisons for first-time offenders (Erstvollzug).  Recidivists are assigned to so-called regular imprisonment (Regelvollzug).  People who receive long sentences are imprisoned at a maximum security prison (Langstrafenanstalt).  Special institutions are also provided for female and juvenile prisoners and for those with special health or psychiatric needs.
Social-therapeutic prisons (sozialtherapeutische Haftanstalten) are special departments for prisoners that have been punished for sexual crimes. In these prisons, groups of 10-15 prisoners live together and each group is supported by assigned social workers, correction officers and psychologists. The goal of these sections is to give the prisoners a chance to refurbish socialization deficits.
Looking at World Prison Brief's website, adults make up the largest percentage of people in prison currently in Germany. According to Prison Studies, adults make up 97.2% of all prisoners with 2.8% being juveniles/minors/young prisoners. (Prison Studies, 2018)

Prison population 

In 2019, all states of Germany reported an increase in the share of foreign and stateless inmates in the Prisons in Germany in the preceding 3-5 year period.

The number of foreigners were also increasing in prisons situated in the new states of Germany. The authorities of Saxony reported 482 (March 2016), 601 (2018) and 981 (February 2019). The largest foreign groups were from Poland, Tunisia, Libya, Chechnya and Georgia.

Prisoner advocacy group GG/BO noted that foreign prisoners often do not understand prison rules because they were not explained in their native tongue. A justice official of Bavaria noted that using interpreters which themselves had a foreign background brought benefits because they could function as interpreters and had intimate knowledge of cultural peculiarities.

Law
The first German Prison Act was passed in 1976 by federal legislation. It applies only to adults. Because of a 2006 decision of the Federal Constitutional Court, also Juvenile corrections has to be put on a legal basis by the end of 2007. In an unrelated development, the Federal German parliament decided in 2006, to reorganize relations between the Federal government and the Länder (states) ("federalism reform"). In this context prison legislation was assigned to the individual Länder. By 1 January 2008, prison laws for adults would come into effect in three Länder (Bavaria, Hamburg, Lower Saxony). In the other Länder the old Federal Prison Act will remain in force for the time being.

Previous types of prisons
Before 1970, there were five kinds of confinement in Germany. They were Zuchthaus (prison), Gefängnis (prison), Einschließung (jail), Arbeitshaus (workhouse), and Haft (custody). A Zuchthaus was a prison of hard, physically exerting labor, such as breaking rocks, where prisoners had to work, even to the point of collapse. This was repealed by a reform of the penal code, which took effect on March 31, 1970 . Today, a Gefängnis is known as a Justizvollzugsanstalt, or "Justice Enforcement Facility".

See also
Crime in Germany
Law enforcement in Germany

References

External links

University of Bremen prisons archive: https://web.archive.org/web/20111130234419/http://www.strafvollzugsarchiv.de/